The men's 200 metre backstroke event at the 1988 Summer Olympics took place on 22 September at the Jamsil Indoor Swimming Pool in Seoul, South Korea. There were 44 competitors from 32 nations. Each nation had been limited to two swimmers in the event since 1984. The event was won by Igor Polyansky of the Soviet Union. Frank Baltrusch of East Germany took silver, while Paul Kingsman of New Zealand earned bronze. The medals were the first in the men's 200 metre backstroke for the Soviet Union and New Zealand; East Germany had not medaled in the event since Roland Matthes won gold in 1968 and 1972. For the first time, the United States competed and did not earn at least silver.

The award ceremony did not go smoothly. Kingsman was erroneously introduced as being from the Soviet Union. When his nationality was corrected to New Zealand, it was also announced that the New Zealand national anthem would be played. This had to be corrected as well, and the Soviet anthem (for the winner, Polyansky) was played.

Background

This was the eighth appearance of the 200 metre backstroke event. It was first held in 1900. The event did not return until 1964; since then, it has been on the programme at every Summer Games. From 1904 to 1960, a men's 100 metre backstroke was held instead. In 1964, only the 200 metres was held. Beginning in 1968 and ever since, both the 100 and 200 metre versions have been held.

None of the 8 finalists from the 1984 Games returned. The medalists at the 1986 World Aquatics Championships had been Igor Polyansky of the Soviet Union, Frank Baltrusch of East Germany, and Frank Hoffmeister of West Germany. All three competed in Seoul. Polyansky was also the world record holder, having set it in a Soviet-East German dual meet in 1985. He was the heavy favourite in the event, with his only loss since 1985 being the European championship (to fellow Soviet Sergei Zabolotnov).

Costa Rica, Guam, Iceland, Lebanon, Singapore, South Korea, the United Arab Emirates, and Zimbabwe each made their debut in the event. Australia and Great Britain each made their seventh appearance, tied for most among nations to that point.

Competition format

The competition used a two-round (heats and final) format. The advancement rule followed the format introduced in 1952. A swimmer's place in the heat was not used to determine advancement; instead, the fastest times from across all heats in a round were used. A "consolation final" had been added in 1984. There were 6 heats of up to 8 swimmers each. The top 8 swimmers advanced to the final. The next 8 (9th through 16th) competed in a consolation final. Swim-offs were used as necessary to break ties.

This swimming event used backstroke. Because an Olympic-size swimming pool is 50 metres long, this race consisted of four lengths of the pool.

Records

Prior to this competition, the existing world and Olympic records were as follows.

Schedule

All times are Korea Standard Time adjusted for daylight savings (UTC+10)

Results

Heats

The eight fastest swimmers advanced to Final A, while the next eight went to Final B.

Finals

The finals were held in the evening of 22 September.

Final B

Final A

Zabalotnov led at the halfway mark. Polyansky took the lead during the third length, with Baltrusch and Kingsman also passing Zabolotnov.

References

External links
 Official Report
 USA Swimming

Men's backstroke 200 metre
200 metre backstroke at the Olympics
Men's events at the 1988 Summer Olympics